Thái Thị Thảo (born 12 February 1995) is a Vietnamese footballer who plays as a midfielder for Women's Championship club Hà Nội I and the Vietnam women's national team.

She also played for Vietnam women's national futsal team in 2017 SEA Games.

International goals
.''Scores and results are list Vietnam's goal tally first.

References

1995 births
Living people
Women's association football midfielders
Vietnamese women's footballers
Vietnam women's international footballers
Footballers at the 2018 Asian Games
Asian Games competitors for Vietnam
21st-century Vietnamese women